Josh Inman (born March 13, 1980) is an American rower. Inman was born and raised in Hillsboro, Oregon, where he graduated from Hillsboro High School and became an Eagle Scout.  He lettered with the Oregon State Beavers men's rowing team during the years 2000–2003.  After graduation, he joined the US National Team with some success and was selected as the USRowing Male athlete of the year in 2005. In the 2008 Summer Olympics, he won a bronze medal in the men's eight.   He won the Stewards' Challenge Cup at the 2010 Henley Royal Regatta.

References 

 

1980 births
Living people
Rowers at the 2008 Summer Olympics
Olympic bronze medalists for the United States in rowing
Oregon State Beavers men's golfers
Sportspeople from Hillsboro, Oregon
Hillsboro High School (Oregon) alumni
American male rowers
Medalists at the 2008 Summer Olympics
World Rowing Championships medalists for the United States